Albert Mammoga "Nocks" Seabi (born 21 September 1962) is a South African politician who has been a Member of the National Assembly of South Africa since 30 July 2018. Seabi is a member of the African National Congress.

Parliamentary career
In July 2018, Seabi was elected to the National Assembly of South Africa to replace Winnie Madikizela-Mandela as a member of the African National Congress. From 28 August 2018 to 7 May 2019, he served as a member of the Portfolio Committee of Transport.

Following the 2019 general election, he returned to the National Assembly. He now serves as a member of the Portfolio Committee on Sports, Arts and Culture.

References

External links
Mr Albert Mammoga Seabi at Parliament of South Africa

Living people
1962 births
People from Limpopo
Members of the National Assembly of South Africa
African National Congress politicians